Keokradong is a peak located in Bandarban, Bangladesh, with an elevation of . Some sources claim it as the highest point of Bangladesh.

On the top of Keokradong there is a small shelter and a signboard put up by Bangladesh Army proclaiming the elevation to be .

There is a controversy about the highest point of Bangladesh, and some sources indicate Saka Haphong as the most elevated peak of the country. However, Tazing Dong is officially recognized as the highest point of Bangladesh.

Keokradong is a popular tourist attraction in Bangladesh for mountaineers. Keokradong is one of the cloudiest places in Bangladesh.

Gallery

See also
 Geography of Bangladesh
 List of mountains of Bangladesh

Notes

Keokradong
Bandarban District